Harrison Township is one of the twelve townships of Hamilton County, Ohio, United States.  The 2020 census found 14,288 people in the township.

Geography
Located in the northwestern corner of the county, it borders the following townships:
Morgan Township, Butler County - north
Crosby Township - east
Whitewater Township - southeast
Miller Township, Dearborn County, Indiana - southwest corner
Harrison Township, Dearborn County, Indiana - west
Whitewater Township, Franklin County, Indiana - northwest corner

The city of Harrison is located in central Harrison Township but also extends into Crosby Township.

Name and history
It is one of nineteen Harrison Townships statewide.

Government
The township is governed by a three-member board of trustees, who are elected in November of odd-numbered years to a four-year term beginning on the following January 1.  Two are elected in the year after the presidential election and one is elected in the year before it.  There is also an elected township fiscal officer, who serves a four-year term beginning on April 1 of the year after the election, which is held in November of the year before the presidential election.  Vacancies in the fiscal officership or on the board of trustees are filled by the remaining trustees.

References

External links
Township website

Townships in Hamilton County, Ohio
Townships in Ohio